Chung Hoon (born April 29, 1969 in Buan County, Jeollabuk-do) is a South Korean judoka.

Chung was the World Champion at 71 kg in 1993. He won a bronze medal in the 1991 World Championships.

Chung represented South Korea in the 1992 Olympic Games, winning bronze in the Lightweight division. In the semifinal, he lost to Hungarian Bertalan Hajtós. Next year, Chung went up against the Hungarian judoka again in the final at the World Championship and avenged the loss by decision.

Chung retired from competitive judo after winning his second Asian Game gold medal in 1994. Chung has been serving as a judo instructor and professor for Yong-In University and the head coach of the South Korean national judo team.

External links
 

Judoka at the 1992 Summer Olympics
Olympic judoka of South Korea
Olympic bronze medalists for South Korea
Living people
1969 births
Sportspeople from North Jeolla Province
Olympic medalists in judo
Asian Games medalists in judo
Judoka at the 1990 Asian Games
Judoka at the 1994 Asian Games
South Korean male judoka
Medalists at the 1992 Summer Olympics
Asian Games gold medalists for South Korea
Medalists at the 1990 Asian Games
Medalists at the 1994 Asian Games
Goodwill Games medalists in judo
Competitors at the 1994 Goodwill Games
20th-century South Korean people
21st-century South Korean people